Streptomyces spongiae is a bacterium species from the genus of Streptomyces which has been isolated from the marine sponge Haliclona in Tateyama in Chiba in Japan.

See also 
 List of Streptomyces species

References

External links
Type strain of Streptomyces spongiae at BacDive -  the Bacterial Diversity Metadatabase	

spongiae
Bacteria described in 2011